The 1988 Florida Citrus Bowl was held on January 1, 1988 at the Florida Citrus Bowl in Orlando, Florida.  The #14 Clemson Tigers defeated the #20 Penn State Nittany Lions by a score of 35–10.

The first quarter saw both teams score: first the Tigers on a 7-yard rush and then Penn State on a 39-yard pass. The second quarter saw only a Clemson touchdown on a 6-yard rush, and the halftime score was 14–7. Penn State converted a 27-yard field goal to cut the deficit to 4, but then Clemson proceeded to score 21 unanswered points. The Tigers scored on a 1-yard touchdown rush to end the third quarter 21–10, and then scored on two more rushes, from 25 and 4 yards out. Clemson won the game by a score of 35–10.

References

Florida Citrus Bowl
Citrus Bowl (game)
Clemson Tigers football bowl games
Penn State Nittany Lions football bowl games
Florida Citrus Bowl
Florida Citrus Bowl